The Călineşti gas field is a natural gas field located in Călinești, Teleorman County. It was discovered in 2010 and developed by Carpathian Energy. It will begin production in 2014 and will produce natural gas and condensates. The total proven reserves of the Călineşti gas field are around 63 billion cubic feet (1.8 km³), and production will be centered on 10 million cubic feet/day (0.30×105m³).

References

Natural gas fields in Romania